Griffiths Mlungisi Mxenge (27 February 1935 – 19 November 1981) was born in KwaRayi, a rural settlement outside of King Williams Town, Eastern Cape. He was a civil rights lawyer, a member of the African National Congress (ANC) and a South African anti-apartheid activist.

Early life

Griffiths Mlungisi Mxenge was the eldest son of Johnson Pinti and Hannah Nowise Mxenge. His parents were farmers in KwaRayi. He began his high schooling at Forbes Grant Secondary school in Ginsberg but matriculated from Newell High school in Port Elizabeth in 1956.

In 1959, he received a bachelor's degree from Fort Hare University majoring in Roman Dutch Law and English. He joined the African National Congress Youth League while he was studying. The Defiance Campaign and the Congress of the People in Kliptown contributed to his political consciousness 

He enrolled for an LLB degree at the University of Natal but in 1962, the same year he married Victoria Mxenge.

In 1966, his studies were interrupted when he was detained for 190 days. In 1967, he was imprisoned for two years on Robben Island under the Suppression of Communism Act for furthering the aims of the ANC. Mxenge's first son, Mbasa, was born while he was in detention.

In 1969, Mxenge was released from Robben Island and served with a two-year banning order that among other things prohibited him from entering University premises. With the help of the Dean of Law Faculty, the late Professor Tony Matthews, he was still able to complete his LLB and graduate in 1970.

His second son, Viwe was born in 1970.

Career

In 1971 Mxenge began serving his articles under Rabie Bugwandeen of the Natal Indian Congress. He was issued with a five-year banning order the same year.

In 1974, he was admitted as an attorney of the Supreme Court of South Africa. The following year, in 1975, he opened his own legal practice in Durban. His daughter, Namhla, was also born. He represented members of the African National Congress and other parties. Notably, he defended Joseph Mduli, a member of the ANC and Umkonto weSizwe, who was brutally murdered. In an unprecedented move, following Mxenge's efforts and international pressure, four policemen were charged with the murder of Mduli.

Mxenge was later detained for his involvement in the murder case.

He was an active member of the Release Mandela Committee and served as a member of the Lawyers for Human Rights. Mxenge was a founding member of the South African Democratic Lawyers Association.

Death

In 1981, Mxenge was assassinated by the apartheid death squad, led by Dirk Coetzee, in Umlazi township south of Durban . He was abducted before the death squad stabbed him 45 times, beat him with a hammer and slit his throat.  His body was found near a soccer field in Umlazi.

Four years after her husband's murder, Victoria Mxenge was shot and hacked to death in front of her children at their Umlazi home in Durban.

On 4 November 1996, former Vlakplaas commander, Dirk Coetzee, testified about his involvement in the murder of Griffiths Mxenge. He also asked for amnesty from the Truth and Reconciliation Commission. Despite protests from Mxenge's family, Coetzee was granted amnesty.

Legacy

Mxenge and his wife were both awarded the Order of Luthuli in Silver by the South African government. His award recognised his contribution to the field of law and the supreme sacrifice he made in the fight against apartheid in South Africa 

The Victoria and Griffiths Mxenge memorial lecture is hosted annually at the University of KwaZulu Natal's Howard College.

See also
Dirk Coetzee
Death Squad

External links
 ANC archives

References

1935 births
1981 deaths
Assassinated South African activists
People from Buffalo City Metropolitan Municipality
Extrajudicial killings in South Africa
Xhosa people
Members of the African National Congress
Inmates of Robben Island
20th-century South African lawyers
Anti-apartheid activists
Assassinated South African people
Members of the Order of Luthuli